Vallée-du-Ruiter Ecological Reserve is an ecological reserve in Quebec, Canada. It was established on October 21, 1993.

References

External links
 Official website from Government of Québec

Protected areas of Estrie
Nature reserves in Quebec
Protected areas established in 1993
1993 establishments in Quebec